Elisha Dyer Jr. (November 29, 1839November 29, 1906) was a Rhode Island politician who was 45th Governor of Rhode Island from 1897 to 1900.  He was the son of Elisha Dyer, Governor of Rhode Island from 1857 to 1859.

Early life
Dyer was born in Providence, Rhode Island. He was the son of Rhode Island Governor Elisha Dyer (1811–1890) and Anna Jones (née Hoppin) Dyer (1815–1884). His siblings included George Rathbun Dyer (1834–1851), Anna Jones Dyer Hubbard (1844–1884), Gabriel Bernon Dyer (1847–1902), and William Jones Dyer (1850–1915).

He earned a bachelor's degree in chemistry from Brown University and a Ph.D. in chemistry from the University of Giessen.  While attending Brown, he joined the Zeta Psi Fraternity.

Career

Military service
Dyer's military career began in October 1856 when he enlisted in the First Light Infantry, a prestigious unit of the Rhode Island Militia located in Providence.  On April 8, 1858 he was appointed by his father as a colonel and aide-de-camp on his father's military staff.  He relinquished the position when his father left office in May 1859.

On the outbreak of the Civil War, Dyer enlisted as the 4th sergeant of the 1st Light Artillery Battery of Rhode Island on April 15, 1861.  Sergeant Dyer was sent with the battery to Easton, Pennsylvania to train other volunteer artillery units.  Dyer was discharged shortly after his arrival due to accidental injuries he suffered after an explosion of a limber chest, on April 21, 1861.

On September 28, 1861 he was commissioned lieutenant and commissary of the Providence Marine Corps of Artillery.  He was promoted to captain on  April 28, 1862 and to major on June 7, 1862.  He also served as military aide-de-camp to Governor James Y. Smith, with the rank of colonel, from May 26, 1863 to May 29, 1866.

On June 7, 1869 he was elected lieutenant colonel commanding the Providence Marine Corps of Artillery, serving until April 24, 1871.  He was re-elected as lieutenant colonel of the Providence Marine Corps of Artillery on April 29, 1872 and served until April 27, 1874.  On May 10, 1875 he was commissioned as a lieutenant colonel and was placed in command of 1st Battalion of Light Artillery and served until May 13, 1878.

On February 7, 1882, Dyer was appointed as adjutant general of the Rhode Island Militia and was promoted to the rank of brigadier general.  He held this position until October 31, 1895 when he retired at his own request.  His 13 years in office was one of the longest tenures in that position.

Political career
Dyer was elected to the Rhode Island Senate in 1877 and to the Rhode Island House of Representatives in 1882.  He then served as Adjutant General of Rhode Island, with the rank of brigadier general, from 1882 to 1895.

In 1896, he was elected Governor of Rhode Island as a Republican.  He was re-elected twice and served from 1897 to 1900. After serving as governor, he was again elected to the state Senate in 1904, and then was elected Mayor of Providence in 1905 and took office the following January and served until his death on November 29, 1906, his 67th birthday.

Memberships
Upon his father's death, in 1890, he succeeded to First Class membership in the Military Order of the Loyal Legion of the United States.  Dyer was admitted as an hereditary member of the Rhode Island Society of the Cincinnati in 1898 by right of his descent from Captain William Jones, a veteran of the Revolutionary War.  He was a charter member of the Rhode Island Society of Colonial Wars in 1897.  He joined the Rhode Island Society of the Sons of the American Revolution in 1899 and served as its president from 1903 to 1904.

Personal life
Dyer was married to Nancy Anthony Viall (1843–1920). She was the daughter of William Viall and Mary Brayton Anthony. Together, they were the parents of:

 Elisha Dyer III (1862–1917), who married Sidney Turner Swan (1857–1933).
 George Rathbone Dyer (1867–1867), who died young.
 George Rathbone Dyer (1869–1934), who married Grace Gurnee Scott (1870–1926)
 Hezekiah Anthony Dyer (1872–1943), who married Charlotte Osgood Tilden (1874–1953)

He died in Providence, while serving in office as Mayor, on his 67th birthday in 1906. He is interred in Swan Point Cemetery in Providence.

References

External links

 National Governors Association profile
 NYTimes article regarding Mayor Elisha Dyer's will

1839 births
1906 deaths
Republican Party governors of Rhode Island
Republican Party members of the Rhode Island House of Representatives
Republican Party Rhode Island state senators
Mayors of Providence, Rhode Island
Brown University alumni
Burials at Swan Point Cemetery
General Society of Colonial Wars
19th-century American politicians
Dyer family